Kim Joon-hyung (Korean: 김준형; Hanja: 金峻亨; born 29 March 1963) is a South Korean professor of international relations at Handong Global University served as the Chancellor of Korea National Diplomatic Academy of Ministry of Foreign Affairs under President Moon Jae-in from 2019 to 2021.

Kim joined both Moon's presidential campaigns in 2012 and 2017 as his advisor on foreign and North Korean policies.

Since the beginning of Moon's presidency, Kim has been involved in his policy formulation as an advisor on multiple occasions. As a member of Foreign Affairs and Security Sub-committee of State Affairs Planning Advisory Committee, a Moon's de facto transition team, he is reportedly known to be the co-author of Moon's "New Southern Policy" which seeks to and resulted in expansion of South Korea's relations with ASEAN nations and India in all aspects. Before resigning for Chancellor, he has also served as a member of the National Security Council Advisory Committee, a chair of Advisory Committee for Reforming Ministry of Foreign Affairs and a member of Peace and Prosperity Committee of Presidential Commission on Policy Planning roughly from the beginning of Moon's presidency.

He participated in "1.5 track meeting" in Helsinki between South Korean, North Korean and American officials in March 2018.

Moreover, he was previously a member of foreign policy and security sub-committee of policy evaluation committee under President Roh Moo-hyun.

Furthermore, he hosted several TV shows in early 2000s, and has frequently shared his views on updates on Inter-Korean and North Korea–United States relations on media.

After completing his doctorate studies in the United States, he worked as a researcher at the United States Institute of Peace. He then came back to Korea and taught international relations at multiple universities as part-time lecturer. Since 1999 when he joined the faculty as an assistant professor, he has been teaching international relations at School of International Studies, Languages and Literature of Handong Global University

Kim holds three degrees in politics: bachelor from Yonsei University in 1986 and master and doctorate in political science from George Washington University in 1990 and 1996.

External links 

 Chancellor of Korea National Diplomatic Academy

References 

1963 births
Living people
Yonsei University alumni
Columbian College of Arts and Sciences alumni
South Korean government officials
Academic staff of Handong Global University
Experts on North Korea
George Washington University alumni